Indo–Zambia Bank (IZB), whose full name is Indo–Zambia Bank Limited, is a commercial bank in Zambia. It is licensed by the Bank of Zambia, the central bank and national banking regulator.

Overview
IZB is a medium-sized financial services provider in Zambia, providing retail banking services to the communities it serves. , the bank controlled total assets of ZMW:2.967 billion (US$303 million), with shareholders' equity of  ZMW:685.5 million (US$70 million).

History
The bank was founded in on 19 October 1984 by the Government of Zambia, and three state owned Indian banks: (a) Bank of Baroda (b) Bank of India and (c) Central Bank of India. Indo-Zambia Bank is a significant employer in the communities that it serves and is an active participant in Corporate Social Responsibility activities in Zambia.

Location
The headquarters and main branch of the bank are located at 6907 Cairo Road, in the city of Lusaka, the capital city of Zambia, and its largest metropolitan area. The geographical coordinates of the bank's headquarters are: 15°25'23.0"S, 28°16'59.0"E (Latitude:-15.423056; Longitude:28.283056).

Ownership
The stock of Indo-Zambia Bank is held by four investors. The table below shows the ownership percentage of each shareholder:

Branch network
The bank maintains its headquarters in Lusaka, the capital and largest city in Zambia. , it had a network of twenty-eight branches and 4 agencies in various parts of the country.

Governance
Mrs. Orlean Moyo, a Zambian, is the Chairperson of the eight-person Board of Directors. Mahesh Bansal, a national of India, serves as the Managing Director.

See also

References

External links
Website of Indo-Zambia Bank
Website of Bank of Zambia 

Banks of Zambia
Bank of Baroda
Companies based in Lusaka
Banks established in 1984
1984 establishments in Zambia